Bec can be sometimes a place-name element meaning pino'cape' (from the bird's beak, bec)

Bec is more commonly a place-name element in Normandy, deriving from Norse bekkr, 'stream' (cf. German Bach, English -beck), which is found in many placenames.

Part of a Name 
Bec-de-Mortagne, Seine-Maritime
Notre-Dame-du-Bec, Seine-Maritime
Le Bec Hellouin, Eure
Abbaye Notre-Dame du Bec, Eure
Le Bec-Thomas, Eure
Malleville-sur-le-Bec, Eure

Suffix
Bolbec, Seine-Maritime
Bricquebec, Manche
Caudebec-en-Caux, Seine-Maritime
Caudebec-les-Elbeuf, Seine-Maritime pino
Foulbec, Eure
Houlbec-Cocherel, Eure
Houlbec-près-le-Gros-Theil, Eure
Orbec, Orne
Robec, stream in Rouen, Seine-Maritime222
Lubec, Maine

England 
Tooting Bec, London
Weedon Bec, Northamptonshire

Other
Saint-Julia-de-Bec, Aude3425

Variation 
Beck (surname)
River Beck
Beek (disambiguation)
Becque (disambiguation)
Becquet
Becket

Place name element etymologies
Prefixes
English suffixes

fr:Bec (homonymie)